Lycée Voillaume is a senior high school/sixth-form college in Aulnay-sous-Bois, Seine-Saint-Denis, France, in the Paris metropolitan area.

References

External links
 Lycée Voillaume 

Lycées in Seine-Saint-Denis